Sundsvalls DFF (Sundsvalls damfotbollsförening) is a women's association football-club from Sundsvall, Sweden. The club was established in 1984 by GIF Sundsvall. The club played in the Damallsvenskan during the 1991 season. It was relegated to the Division 1 following the 1992 season.

Sundsvalls DFF play their home games at the Norrporten Arena in Sundsvall. The team colors are blue and white.

Current squad

References

External links 
 Official website 

Sundsvalls DFF
Sundsvalls DFF
1984 establishments in Sweden
Association football clubs established in 1984